Willis Robert "Billy" Drummond Jr. (born June 19, 1959) is an American jazz drummer.

Early life
Billy Drummond was born in Newport News, Virginia, where he grew up listening to the extensive jazz record collection of his father, an amateur drummer and jazz enthusiast. He started playing the drums at four and was performing locally in his own band by the age of eight, and playing music with other kids in the neighborhood, including childhood friends Victor Wooten and his brothers, who lived a few doors away and through whom he met Consuela Lee Moorehead, composer, arranger, music theory professor, and the founder of the Springtree/Snow Hill Institute for the Performing Arts. He attended Shenandoah College and Conservatory of Music on a Classical Percussion scholarship and, upon leaving school, became a member of a local Top 40 band called The Squares with bass phenom Oteil Burbridge.

Career
In 1986, encouraged by Al Foster, who had invited him to sit in at the Village Vanguard and advised him to take the next step, he moved to New York and almost immediately joined the band, Out of the Blue, with whom he recorded their last album, Spiral Staircase (Blue Note Records). A year later, he joined the Horace Silver sextet, touring extensively with him before becoming a member of Sonny Rollins's band, with whom he toured for three years. During this period he also formed long-term musical associations with Joe Henderson, Bobby Hutcherson, Buster Williams, James Moody, JJ Johnson, Andrew Hill, and others.

He has made four albums as bandleader, including his Criss Cross album Dubai (featuring Chris Potter, Walt Weiskopf and Peter Washington), which was included in the list of “50 Crucial Jazz Drumming Recordings of the Past 100 Years” by Modern Drummer magazine. His most recent album, Valse Sinistre, leading his band Freedom of Ideas, with Micah Thomas, Dezron Douglas and Dayna Stephens, came out on the Canadian Cellar Live label in August 2022. He has made five albums as a co-leader, including We’ll Be Together Again with Javon Jackson and Ron Carter. In addition to touring he is Professor of Jazz Drums at the Juilliard School and New York University.

A sideman on over 350 records, Drummond has played and recorded with, among others, Bobby Hutcherson, Nat Adderley, Ralph Moore, Buster Williams, Charles Tolliver, Lew Tabackin and Toshiko Akiyoshi, Hank Jones, James Moody, Sonny Rollins, Andy LaVerne, Lee Konitz, Dave Stryker, George Colligan, Ted Rosenthal, Bruce Barth, Joe Lovano, Andrew Hill, Larry Willis, Toots Thielmans, Freddie Hubbard, Chris Potter, Eddie Gómez, Stanley Cowell, Javon Jackson, and Sheila Jordan. He is a long-time member of Carla Bley's Lost Chords Quartet, Sheila Jordan's Quartet, and the Steve Kuhn Trio.

Discography

As leader
 1991 Native Colours (Criss Cross)
 1993 The Gift (Criss Cross)
 1995 Dubai (Criss Cross)
 2022 Valse Sinistre (Cellar Live)

As co-leader
 2003 Pas de Trois The Drummonds
 2006 Mysterious Shorter Nicholas Payton/Bob Belden/Sam Yahel/Billy Drummond/John Hart
 2006 Once Upon a Time The Drummonds
 2006 Letter to Evans The Drummonds
 2006 Beautiful Friendship The Drummonds
 2016 Three's Company Ron Carter/Javon Jackson/Billy Drummond

With OTB
 1989 Spiral Staircase Out of the Blue

With Nat Adderley
The Old Country (Alfa, 1990)

With Carla Bley
 2003 Looking for America
 2004 The Lost Chords
 2007 The Lost Chords find Paolo Fresu
 2008 Appearing Nightly

With Steve Kuhn
 1997 Dedication  (Reservoir)
 1998 Countdown (Reservoir)
 2000 The Best Things  (Reservoir)
 2001 Temptation
 2002 Waltz – Red Side
 2002 Waltz – Blue Side
 2004 Easy to Love 
 2007 Pastorale 
 2007 Baubles, Bangles and Beads
 2007 Pavanne for a Dead Princess
 2010 I Will Wait for You

With Stanley Cowell
 2014 Are You Real 
 2015 Reminiscent
 2017 No Illusions

With Eddie Henderson
 1998 Dreams of Gershwin 
 1999 Reemergence 
 2001 Oasis 
 2010 For All We Know

As sideman
 Old Country (1990) with Nat Adderley
 Sam I Am (1990) with Sam Newsome
 In New York (1990) with Tomas Franck
 For the Moment (1990 with Renee Rosnes
 Mirage (1991) with Bobby Hutcherson
 Hornucopia (1991) with Jon Faddis
 John Swana and Friends (1991) with John Swana
 Mirage (1991) with Bobby Hutcherson
 Better Times (1992) with Rob Bargad
 The Charmer (1992) with Charles Fambrough
 Epistrophy (1992) with Bill Pierce
 Simplicity (1992) with Walt Weiskopf
 Without Words (1992) with Renee Rosnes
 Dawnbird (1993) with Vincent Herring
 Secret Love (1993) with Vincent Herring
 Blue Note Years (1993) with Joe Henderson
 Feeling's Mutual (1993) with John Swana
 Scheme of Things (1993) with Scott Wendholt
 In from the Cold (1994, Criss Cross) with Jonny King
 Days of Wine and Roses (1994) with Vincent Herring
 Dearly Beloved (SteepleChase, 1996) with Lee Konitz
 Notes from the Underground (1996, Enja) with Jonny King
 Bluesology with George Cables (SteepleChase, 1997)
 Out of Nowhere with Lee Konitz and Paul Bley (SteepleChase, 1997)
 RichLee! with Lee Konitz and Rich Perry (SteepleChase, 1997)
 Light Breeze with Franco Ambrosetti (Enja, 1998)
 True Blue (1998) with Archie Shepp
 Vertigo (1998) with Chris Potter
 Universal Spirits (1998) with Tim Ries
 Dusk (1999) with Andrew Hill
 Duke's Place (1999) with George Mraz
 Art & Soul (Blue Note, 1999) with Renee Rosnes
 Everything I Need (1999) with Carol Fredette
 Out of the Dark (1999) with Andy Fusco
 Pleasant Valley (1999) with Javon Jackson
 Reemergence (1999) with Eddie Henderson
 Remembrance (1999) with Sadao Watanabe
 Rendezvous (1999) with Jerome Harris
 Search (1999) with Joel Weiskopf
 Sound of Love (1999) with Tommy Smith
 Navigator (2000) with Joel Frahm
 Ask Me Now (2000) with Michael Urbaniak
 Siren (2000) with Walt Weiskopf
 Steal the Moon (2000) with Carolyn Leonhart
 Two Tenor Ballads (2000) with Mark Turner and Tad Shull
 What Goes Unsaid (2000) with Scott Wendholt
 This Will Be (2001) with Chris Potter
 Oasis (2001) with Eddie Henderson
 Song (2001) with Marty Ehrlich
 Workin' Out (2001) with John Campbell
 Cedars of Avalon (2001) with Larry Coryell
 Alternate Side (2001) with Tim Ries
 With a Little Help from My Friends (2001) with Renee Rosnes
 Deja Vu (2001) with Archie Shepp
 Waltz for Debbie (2002) with David Hazeltine
 Wurd on the Skreet (2002) with Donald Brown
 Life on Earth (2003) with Renee Rosnes
 Line on Love (2003) with Marty Ehrlich
 Little Song (2003) with Sheila Jordan
 Strings (2003) with Jim Snidero
 French Ballads (2003) with Archie Shepp
 Deja Vu (2003) with Archie Shepp
 The Lost Chords (2003) with Carla Bley
 Dream Dancing (2004) with Steve Kuhn
 Close Up (2004) with Jim Snidero
 Tea for Two (2004) with Walt Weiskopf/Andy Fusco Quartet
 Sight to Sound (2004) with Walt Weiskopf
 Winter Sonata (2004) with Gary Versace
 Cleopatra's Dream (2006) David Hazeltine
 Manhattan (2006) David Hazeltine/George Mraz Trio
 Pastorale (2007) with Steve Kuhn
 Baubles, Bangles and Beads (2007) with Steve Kuhn
 Pavanne for a Dead Princess (2007) with Steve Kuhn
 The Lost Chords Find Paolo Fresu (2007) with Carla Bley
 New Conversations (2007) with Carla Bley
 Blue Fable (2007) with Larry Willis
 Nights of Key Largo (2008) with Tessa Souter
 Moon River (2008) with Nicki Parrott
 The Offering (HighNote, 2008) with Larry Willis
 Once Upon a Melody (2008) with Javon Jackson
 Beautiful Love: The NYC Session (2008) with Al Di Meola, Eddie Gómez, Yujata Kobaya
 Appearing Nightly (2008) with Carla Bley
 Art of Organizing (2009) with Dr. Lonnie Smith
 Chick Corea Songbook (2009) with The Manhattan Transfer
 Mutual Admiration Society (2009) with Joe Locke/David Hazeltine
 New Moon (2009) with Ron McCLure
 Mays at the Movies (2009) with Bill Mays
 Crossfire (2009) with Jim Snidero
 One Night at the Kitano (2009) with Jed Levy SteepleChase
 Fly Me to the Moon (2009) with Nicki Parrott
 Mays at the Movies (2009) with Bill Mays
 The Decider (2009) with Peter Zak
 All My Friends are Here (2010) with Arif Mardin compilation
 I Will Wait for You (2010) with Steve Kuhn
 Invitation (2010) with Beat Kaestli
 Cedar Chest (2010) The Music of Cedar Walton compilation
 For All We Know (2010) with Eddie Henderson
 New York Encounter (2010) with Yakov Okun Trio
 Steeplechase Jam Session Volume 29 (2010) Andy Laverne SteepleChase
 Steeplechase Jam Session Volume 30 (2010) Don Braden SteepleChase
 Dedication (2010) with Ron McClure (2010) SteepleChase
 Live at Smalls (2011) with Tim Ries
 Live at Smalls (2011) with Jesse Davis
 Beyond the Blue (2012) with Tessa Souter
 Home Tone (2012) with Tony Lakatos
 Nordic Noon (2012) with Peter Zak SteepleChase
 Jazz in the New Harmonic (2013) with David Chesky
 The Eternal Triangle (2013) with Peter Zak SteepleChase
 Homeland (2014) with Vincent Hsu
 Are You Real (2014) with Stanley Cowell SteepleChase
 Leap of Faith (2015) with Burak Bedikyan SteepleChase
 Primal Scream (2015) with David Chesky
 Rambling Confessions (2015) with John Hebert
 Sing to the Sky (2015) with Emma Larsson
 Tales, Musings, and Other Reveries (2015) with Jeremy Pelt
 Reminiscent (2015) with Stanley Cowell SteepleChase
 Standards (2016) with Peter Zak SteepleChase
 En Rouge (2016) with Atlantico (Dave Schroeder/Sebastien Paindestre)
 Jive Culture (2016) with Jeremy Pelt
 Whirlwind (2016) w/ Andy Fusco SteepleChase
 With Due Respect (2016) w/ Freddie Redd SteepleChase
 En Rouge (2016) w/ Atlantico* Inside the Moment (2017) w/ Camille Thurman
 Live and Uncut (2017) w/ Mark Whitfield
 Cities Between Us (2017) w/ Allegra Levy SteepleChase
 No Illusions (2017) Stanley Cowell SteepleChase
 The Pendulum (2017) w/ Mike Richmond SteepleChase
 Picture in Black and White (NOA, 2018) w/ Tessa Souter
 Jubilation (2018)  w/J im Snidero and Jeremy Pelt
 Trio in the New Harmonic: Aural Paintings (2018) w/ David Chesky
 Monk's Dreams: The Complete Compositions of Thelonious Sphere Monk (Sunnyside, 2018) w/ Frank Kimbrough
 NYCD: A Tribute to Art Van Damme (2018) w/ Pierre Eriksson
 Out in the Open (2018) w/ Sam Dillon
 New Easter Island (2019)  w/ Atlantico
 One Mind (2018) w/ Peter Zak Quartet
 Tones for Joan’s Bones (2018) w/ Mike Richmond SteepleChase
 New Departure (2018)  w/ Takayuki Yagi
 Playing Who I Am (2019) w/ Andrea Domenici
 New Easter Island (2019) w/ Atlantico
 Friday the 13th (Steeplechase, 2020) w/ Stephen Riley
 Jazz Dance Suites (Chazz Mack Music, 2020) w/ Charles McPherson
 Kimbrough (Newvelle, 2021) A tribute album to Frank Kimbrough featuring 67 artists curated by Elan Mehler
Early Spring (Steeplechase, 2021) w/ Anthony Ferrara
On the Move (Stunt, 2021) w/ Gabor Bolla

Sources
 Leonard Feather and Ira Gitler, The Biographical Encyclopedia of Jazz. Oxford, 1999, p. 154.
 Gary W. Kennedy, "Billy Drummond". Grove Dictionary of Jazz online.

References

American jazz drummers
Musicians from New Jersey
1959 births
Living people
Chesky Records artists
People from West Orange, New Jersey
20th-century American drummers
American male drummers
Jazz musicians from Virginia
20th-century American male musicians
American male jazz musicians
Out of the Blue (American band) members